Magnus Gustafsson defeated Patrick McEnroe 6–4, 6–0 to win the 1994 Benson and Hedges Open singles competition. Alexander Volkov was the defending champion.

Seeds
A champion seed is indicated in bold text while text in italics indicates the round in which that seed was eliminated. NB: There was no 8th seed at this tournament.

  Magnus Gustafsson (champion)
  Alexander Volkov (second round)
  Brett Steven (quarterfinals)
  Marcos Ondruska (quarterfinals)
  Greg Rusedski (first round)
  Fabrice Santoro (second round)
  Jordi Burillo (first round)

Draw

Key
 Q – Qualifier
 WC – Wild card
 LL – Lucky loser

External links
 ATP Singles draw

Singles
ATP Auckland Open